Falo is a small town and commune in the Cercle of Bla in the Ségou Region of southern-central Mali. In 1998 the commune had a population of 25,735.

References

Communes of Ségou Region